The 1920 Toledo Blue and Gold football team was an American football team that represented Toledo University (renamed the University of Toledo in 1967) as an independent during the 1920 college football season. Led by second-year coach Watt Hobt, Toledo compiled a 0–3 record while their final four games of the season were canceled.

Schedule

References

Toledo
Toledo Rockets football seasons
College football winless seasons
Toledo Blue and Gold football